Rose Edith Kelly (23 July 1874 – 1932) married noted author, magician and occultist Aleister Crowley in 1903. In 1904, she aided him in the Cairo Working that led to the reception of The Book of the Law, on which Crowley based much of his philosophy and religion, Thelema.

Early life
Rose Edith Kelly was born at 78 Cambridge Terrace, Paddington, to Frederic Festus Kelly and Blanche (Bradford) Kelly. Her grandfather, also named Frederic Festus Kelly, was the founder of Kelly's Directories Ltd.

The eldest of three children -- her siblings being Eleanor Constance Mary and Gerald Festus --  the family moved to the Camberwell vicarage in 1880. Her father served as the curate for the Parish of St. Giles for the next 35 years. 

In 1895, Rose escorted her brother Gerald to Cape Town, South Africa, where he convalesced from a liver ailment during the winter of 1895–96.

On 31 August 1897, she married Major Frederick Thomas Skerrett at St Giles' Church, Camberwell. He was a member of the Royal Army Medical Corps and about fifteen years older than she was. He died on 19 August 1899.

In 1901, she joined her brother Gerald in Paris, France, where she stayed for six months.

Marriage to Crowley and The Book of the Law
Kelly and Aleister Crowley eloped on 11 August and married on 12 August 1903, in order to save her from an arranged marriage. Their relationship, however, went beyond a marriage of convenience. The two went on an extended honeymoon that brought them to Cairo, Egypt, in early 1904.

On 16 March 1904, "in an avowedly frivolous attempt to impress his wife", Crowley tried to "shew the Sylphs" to her using the Bornless Ritual. Although she could see nothing, she did seem to enter into a light trance and repeatedly said, "They're waiting for you!"

This synchronicity and others caused him to pay closer attention to what Rose told him. At her direction, on three successive days beginning 8 April 1904, he entered his room and starting at noon, and for exactly one hour, wrote down what he claimed he heard dictated from a shadowy presence behind him who identified himself as Aiwass. The results over the three days were the three chapters of verse known as The Book of the Law. At one point Crowley failed to hear a sentence, which Rose later amended to page 19 of the original manuscript 'The Five Pointed Star, with a Circle in the Middle, & the circle is Red.'

Rose had two daughters with Crowley: Nuit Ma Ahathoor Hecate Sappho Jezebel Lilith (1904–06) and Lola Zaza (1907–90). Rose and Aleister divorced in 1909. Lola was eventually taken in by her uncle, Gerald. Crowley had a daughter, Louise, by his mistress Isabella Fraux in 1920 in Cefalu. Louise's existence was unknown until her death in 2014.

In 1911, Crowley had her committed to an asylum for alcohol dementia. Rose married Dr Joseph Andrew Gormley(1849-1925) in 1912 and died in 1932.

See also
List of works by Aleister Crowley
Babalon

References

Bibliography
Crowley, Aleister. (1979). The Confessions of Aleister Crowley. London;Boston : Routledge & Kegan Paul. 
The Holy Books of Thelema. (1983). York Beach: Samuel Weiser, Inc.
Hudson, Derek. (1975). For Love of Painting - The Life of Sir Gerald Kelly. London: Peter Davies.
Martin Booth. (2000). A Magick Life - a biography of Aleister Crowley. London: Hodder and Stoughton.
Sutin, Lawrence. (2000). Do What Thou Wilt: A life of Aleister Crowley. New York: St. Martin's Griffin 2002.

1874 births
1932 deaths
People from Paddington
English Thelemites